Régulus was a  74-gun ship of the line of the French Navy.

From 25 May 1801, her armament was upgraded to between 80 and 86 guns.

She patrolled from the Gulf of Guinea to Brazil and the Caribbean. On 6 January 1806 the French squadron captured the 16-gun sloop-of-war . The squadron also captured about 20 merchantman, notably including the ships  and Plowers.

In 1808, Régulus was in station with the Brest squadron.

In 1809, she was transferred to Rochefort. She famously took part in the Battle of the Basque Roads from 11 April 1809, under Captain Lucas, where she ran aground between Les Palles and Fouras. For 17 days, the stranded ship repelled assaults by the British, before refloating and returning to Rochefort on 29.

Fate

Legacy
The scuttling of Régulus occurred off a limestone cliff dotted by numerous caves. The site was named in honour of the ship.

References

Ships of the line of the French Navy
Téméraire-class ships of the line
1805 ships
Maritime incidents in 1809
Maritime incidents in 1814
Ship fires
Scuttled vessels
Shipwrecks in the Bay of Biscay